Myriopholis is a genus of snakes in the family Leptotyphlopidae. Most of the species were previously placed in the genus Leptotyphlops.

Species
The genus contains the following species:
Myriopholis adleri  – Adler's worm snake
Myriopholis albiventer  – white-bellied worm snake  
Myriopholis algeriensis 
Myriopholis blanfordi  – Sindh threadsnake, Blanford's worm snake 
Myriopholis boueti  – Bouet's worm snake
Myriopholis braccianii  – Scortecci's blind snake, Bracciani's worm snake 
Myriopholis burii  – Arabian blind snake, Bury's worm snake
Myriopholis cairi  – Cairo blind snake
Myriopholis erythraeus  – Eritrean worm snake
Myriopholis filiformis  – Socotra Island blind snake
Myriopholis ionidesi  – Ionides's worm snake
Myriopholis lanzai 
Myriopholis longicauda  – long-tailed threadsnake
Myriopholis macrorhyncha  – hook-snouted worm snake, long-nosed worm snake
Myriopholis macrura  – Boulenger's blind snake
Myriopholis narirostris 
Myriopholis nursii  – Nurse's blind snake
Myriopholis occipitalis 
Myriopholis parkeri  – Parker's worm snake
Myriopholis perreti 
Myriopholis rouxestevae  – Roux-Estève's worm snake
Myriopholis tanae  – Tana worm snake
Myriopholis wilsoni  – Wilson's blind snake
Myriopholis yemenica  – Yemen blind snake

Nota bene: A binomial authority in parentheses indicates that the species was originally described in a genus other than Myriopholis.

References

 
Snake genera
Taxa named by Stephen Blair Hedges
Taxa named by William Roy Branch